Zarah may refer to:

 Zarah (television personality), a Filipino-American, also a singer
 Zarah Garde-Wilson (born 1978), Australian solicitor
 Zarah Ghahramani (born 1981), Iranian-born author living in Australia
 Zarah Leander (1907 – 1981), Swedish actress and singer
 Zarah, or Ich weiss, es wird einmal ein Wunder geschehen, a song by Nina Hagen 
 Fort Zarah

See also
 Zahra (name)
 Zara (disambiguation)
 Zaraah Abrahams, English actress